The Truants is a 1922 British silent drama film directed by Sinclair Hill and starring Joan Morgan, George Bellamy and Lewis Gilbert. It is an adaptation of the 1904 novel The Truants by A.E.W. Mason. It was made by Britain's largest film company of the era Stoll Pictures. The film's sets were designed by art director Walter Murton.

Premise
An officer deserts from the French Foreign Legion to return home to his wife's assistance.

Cast
 Joan Morgan as  Millie Stretton 
 George Bellamy as Sir John Stretton 
 Lewis Gilbert as Captain Taverney
 Phillip Simmons as Tony Stretton 
 Lawford Davidson as Lionel Callam 
 Robert English as John Mudge

References

Bibliography
 Low, Rachael. History of the British Film, 1918-1929. George Allen & Unwin, 1971.

External links

1922 films
1922 drama films
British silent feature films
British drama films
Films directed by Sinclair Hill
Films based on British novels
Stoll Pictures films
Films shot at Cricklewood Studios
British black-and-white films
1920s English-language films
1920s British films
Silent drama films